Defaka is an endangered and divergent Nigerian language of uncertain classification. It is spoken in the Opobo–Nkoro LGA of Rivers State, in the Defaka or Afakani ward of Nkọrọ town and Ịwọma Nkọrọ. The low number of Defaka speakers, coupled with the fact that other languages dominate the region where Defaka is spoken, edges the language near extinction on a year-to-year basis. It is generally classified in an Ijoid branch of the Niger–Congo family. However, the Ijoid proposal is problematic. Blench (2012) notes that "Defaka has numerous external cognates and might be an isolate or independent branch of Niger–Congo which has come under Ịjọ influence."

People
Ethnically, the Defaka people are distinct from the Nkoroo, but they have assimilated to Nkoroo culture to such a degree that their language seems to be the only sign of a distinct Defaka identity. Use of the Defaka language however is quickly receding in favour of the language of the Nkoroo, an Ijaw language. Nowadays, most Defaka speakers are elderly people, and even among these, Defaka is rarely spoken — the total number of Defaka speakers is at most 200 nowadays (SIL/Ethnologue 15th ed.). The decrease in use of Defaka is stronger in Nkoroo town than in the Iwoma area. Since the language communities between Defaka and Nkoroo are so intertwined, it is hard to determine which language influences the other. All children grow up speaking Nkoroo (an Ijo language) as a first language. The next most used language among the Defaka is Igbo, owing to the political influence of the Opobo since the days of the Oil Rivers Trade. Igbo has been a language of instruction in many schools in the region and still functions as a regional trade language.

Classification
The Defaka language shows many lexical similarities with Ijọ, some shared regular sound correspondences and some typological similarities with proto-Ịjọ. For example, both languages have a subject–object–verb basic word order, which is otherwise extremely rare in the Niger–Congo language family, being found only in the Mande and Dogon branches.
  ebere ko̘  okuna ɓááma   (the dog SUBJECT the fowl kill:PAST)   The dog killed the fowl (Defaka)
 obiri ɓé o̘ɓó̘kō̘ ɓé ɓám̄   (dog the fowl the kill:PAST)   The dog killed the fowl (Ịjọ, Kalaɓarị dialect)
Also, Defaka has a sex-gender system distinguishing between masculine, feminine, and neuter 3rd-person singular pronouns; this is once again a rarity among south-central Niger–Congo languages other than Ịjoid and Defaka.
á tóɓo 'her head'
o toɓo 'his head'
yé tóɓo 'its head'
While some of the lexical and maybe typological similarities can be attributed to borrowing (as Defaka has been in close contact with Ijọ for more than 300 years), the sound correspondences point to a (somewhat distant) genealogical relationship.

Phonology
Nearly all Defaka are bilingual in Nkọrọọ, and the phonology appears to be the same as that language.

Tone
On long vowels and diphthongs, as well as disyllabic words,  and  contours occur. In addition, there is a downstep that may appear between high tones, and which is the remnant of an elided low tone. However, these all clearly contrast with level-pitched  and rising-pitched .

Vowels
The Ijoid vowel harmony has collapsed in Defaka, as it has in Nkọrọọ. There are five nasal vowels, . All may occur long. Long vowels are at least twice as long as short vowels.

Consonants

Most voiceless obstruents are tenuis. However,  has a slightly negative voice onset time. That is, voicing commences somewhat before the consonant is released, as in English "voiced" stops such as b. This is typical of labial-velar stops. , on the other hand, is fully voiced, as are the other voiced obstruents.

 and  may be nasalised before nasal vowels.

The tap  is pronounced as an approximant, by some speakers. It only occurs between vowels and at the ends of words.

See also
Defaka word list (Wiktionary)

References

 Blench, Roger (2000, rev. 2003) 'Language Death in West Africa' (unpublished paper given at the Round Table on Language Endangerment, Bad Godesborg, February 12–17, 2000).
 Jenewari, Charles E.W. (1983) 'Defaka, Ijo's Closest Linguistic Relative', in Dihoff, Ivan R. (ed.) Current Approaches to African Linguistics Vol 1, 85–111.
 Shryock, A., Ladefoged, P., & Williamson, K. (1996/97) 'The phonetic structures of Defaka', Journal of West African Languages, 26, 2, 3–27.
Williamson, Kay.  1998.  Defaka revisited.  The multi-disciplinary approach to African history, edited by Nkparom C. Ejituwu, Chapter 9, 151-183.  Port Harcourt: University of Port Harcourt Press.

External links
 Defaka at UNESCO
 Defaka word lists and recordings at The UCLA Phonetics Lab.
 Defaka targeted by a proposal to document endangered languages.
 Defaka and Nkoroo a project to document Defaka and Nkoroo

Indigenous languages of Rivers State
Endangered languages of Africa
Ijoid languages
Languages of Nigeria